James Arcene (c. 1862 – June 18, 1885) was the youngest person sentenced to death, who was subsequently executed for the crime, in the United States. Arcene, a Cherokee, was hanged by the U.S. federal government in Fort Smith, Arkansas, for his alleged role in a robbery and murder committed thirteen years earlier, when he was 10 years old.

Arcene and a Cherokee man named William Parchmeal noticed William Feigel, a Swedish national, making a purchase in a store. They followed Feigel when he left, heading for Fort Gibson, and caught up with him about two miles outside of the fort. With robbery as a motive, one of the two shot Fiegel six times before crushing his skull with a rock. Arcene and Parchmeal then divested Fiegel's corpse of its boots and money, totalling only 25 cents ($ today).

Arcene was arrested and tried for the robbery and murder of Feigel, but escaped and eluded capture until he was apprehended and executed at the age of 23. He and Parchmeal were ultimately caught by Deputy Marshal Andrews, after the case had lain cold for more than ten years. "Hanging judge" Isaac Parker presided over the executions, which were held at Fort Smith.

It is difficult to verify James Arcene's age with complete certainty because there are few surviving census records for Indian Territory in the 1870s and 1880s.  Primary documents confirm that, after he was captured, James Arcene claimed to have been a child in 1872 when the crime was committed. He did not revise that statement when it became clear that that status would not help him in sentencing.

Arcene's case is frequently brought up in discussions of the death penalty for children, and to a lesser degree in discussions of the unfair treatment Native Americans received from the United States government.

See also
 Capital punishment for juveniles in the United States

References

1862 births
1885 deaths
Minors convicted of murder
Cherokee Nation people (1794–1907)
American people executed for murder
19th-century executions by the United States
Place of birth missing
People executed by the United States federal government by hanging
19th-century executions of American people
People convicted of murder by the United States federal government
Juvenile offenders executed by the United States
1872 murders in the United States
19th-century Native Americans